Mircea Stănescu (July 17, 1969 – January 5, 2009) was a Romanian Member of Parliament (2004–2008).

Born in Bucharest, he was the son of Romanian journalist Sorin Roșca Stănescu. On December 27, 2008, he committed a car accident which resulted in the death of a pedestrian who was lawfully crossing Alexandru Șerbănescu Street in Bucharest.

On January 5, 2009 Stănescu was found dead at his home in Bucharest, after an apparent suicide by gunshot.

References 

1969 births
2009 suicides
Democratic Liberal Party (Romania) politicians
Social Democratic Party (Romania) politicians
Members of the Chamber of Deputies (Romania)
Romanian politicians who committed suicide
Suicides by firearm in Romania
2009 deaths